Andres Cardenas (born March 9, 2003) is an American soccer player who plays as a midfielder for North Carolina Tar Heels.

Career

Fort Lauderdale CF
Cardenas made his league debut for the club on 18 July 2020 in a 2-0 defeat to the Greenville Triumph.

References

External links
Andres Cardenas at US Soccer Development Academy

2003 births
Living people
Inter Miami CF II players
USL League One players
American soccer players
Association football midfielders
People from Miami-Dade County, Florida
Soccer players from Florida
North Carolina Tar Heels men's soccer players